Kentro is a village and a community of the Grevena municipality. Before the 2011 local government reform it was a part of the municipality of Ventzio, of which it was a municipal district. The 2011 census recorded 102 residents in the village and 232 residents in the community. The community of Kentro covers an area of 42.42 km2. According to the statistics of Vasil Kanchov ("Macedonia, Ethnography and Statistics"), 207 Greek Christians and 150 Vallahades (Grecophone Muslims) lived in the village in 1900.

Administrative division
The community of Kentro consists of three separate settlements: 
Agalaioi (population 47)
Kentro (population 102)
Nisi (population 83)
The aforementioned population figures are as of 2011.

See also
 List of settlements in the Grevena regional unit

References

Populated places in Grevena (regional unit)